Tommy Breen (27 April 1912 – 1 March 1988) was an Irish footballer who played as a goalkeeper for, among others, Belfast Celtic, Manchester United, Linfield and Shamrock Rovers. Breen was a dual international and played for both Ireland teams: the IFA XI and the FAI XI.

Breen replaced Elisha Scott as first-choice goalkeeper for both Belfast Celtic and the IFA XI and was rated by Billy Behan, one of his predecessors at Manchester United and a renowned scout, as one of the best goalkeepers Ireland ever produced. He was also the first Manchester United player ever to play for an FAI XI. During his career, Breen was involved in several controversies; in November 1937, he turned down the chance to play for the FAI XI in a 1938 World Cup qualifier to play for the IFA XI in the 1938 British Home Championship. Then, in 1944, he transferred from Belfast Celtic to their rivals Linfield after a financial dispute.

Sources
The Boys in Green – The FAI International Story (1997): Sean Ryan
Soccer at War – 1939 – 45 (2005): Jack Rollin
DUFC A Claret and Blue History by Brian Whelan (2010)

External links
Northern Ireland Footballing Greats
Ireland (FAI) stats

1912 births
1988 deaths
Association footballers from County Louth
Belfast Celtic F.C. players
Drogheda United F.C. players
Dual Irish international footballers
Association football goalkeepers
League of Ireland players
Glentoran F.C. players
Ireland (FAI) international footballers
Irish Free State association footballers
Linfield F.C. players
NIFL Premiership players
Manchester United F.C. players
People from Drogheda
Pre-1950 IFA international footballers
Republic of Ireland association footballers
Expatriate footballers in England
Shamrock Rovers F.C. players
Expatriate association footballers in Northern Ireland
League of Ireland XI players
Irish Free State international footballers
Irish League representative players
Ireland (IFA) wartime international footballers